Musa Yar'Adua was a Nigerian administrator and politician who served as the Minister of Lagos Affairs during Nigeria's First Republic. Yar'Adua was minister when Lagos Island and the capital territory was designated as the city of Lagos in 1963. He is the father of Umaru Musa Yar'adua, Nigeria's 13th president, and Shehu Musa Yar'adua, Chief of Staff of Obasanjo's military government.

During his lifetime, Yar'Adua first held the chieftaincy title of Tafidan Katsina. He was later elevated to that of the Matawalle of the Katsina Emirate, a title which his father Mallam Umaru once held.

Life 
Yar'Adua was born in 1912 to Malama Binta, a Fulani from the Sullubawa clan who was a princess of the royal family of the Katsina Emirate and a sister of Emir Muhammadu Dikko. His father was Umaru Mutawallin Katsina, a chief whose title made him the royal treasurer of the kingdom. He was educated at Katsina College between 1928 and 1930 and began a career in teaching at Katsina Middle School. He was a teacher for fourteen years before transferring services to the katsina Native Authority. In 1953, he replaced Isa Kaita as the development secretary for the Native Authority and two years later, joined Isa Kaita in the politics of Katsina and Northern Nigeria. In 1959, Yar'Adua represented Katsina Central in parliament and was chosen as Minister of Training and Nigerianisation before moving to the newly created Ministry of Lagos Affairs.

Lagos affairs 
During the years before Nigeria attained independence in 1960 and in the first republic (1960 - 1966), the capital city's physical, social and economic environment underwent a period of rapid growth. Yar'Adua's ministry collaborated with the Lagos City Council and executive development board to manage development with the capital. The ministry was involved in granting lease to foreign missions interested in establishing embassies or consuls in Nigeria and worked with a U.N town planning team composed of Otto Koenigsberger, Charles Abrams, and Maurice Shapiro to develop physical and social amenities.

When the first republic was truncated, Yar'Adua returned to Katsina. During the second republic he was aligned with the conservative National Party of Nigeria.

References

Nigerian politicians
Yar'Adua family